Lucena station is a railway station located on the South Main Line in Lucena, Quezon, Philippines.

The station was opened on February 10, 1913, the station building was enlarged in 1938 together with the completion of the Main Line South. It was a major stopping point on the South Main Line for PNR intercity services until the line's closure in 2006 after Typhoon Milenyo damaged infrastructure. It served both the Bicol Express and the Mayon Limited. It is near the Quezon Provincial Government Center, which houses the provincial government of Quezon] as well as Perez Park and the Lucena Fire Station.  Further away from the station are the Port of Lucena, the Lucena Airport and SM City Lucena.

The station is considered one of the remaining heritage structures in Lucena, being considered by the local government as “important cultural property.” In February 2022, the station was reopened as a terminus for the San Pablo–Lucena Commuter Service for a test run, even though the station is in a partially rebuilt state. There are plans to reopen the station before May 2022. The Chinese ODA-funded rebuild will construct a new station while preserving the remnants of the original.

Lucena station has depot and maintenance facilities.

References

Philippine National Railways stations
Railway stations in Quezon
Buildings and structures in Lucena, Philippines
Railway stations opened in 1913
Railway stations closed in 2006